"The Class of '62" is an episode of the BBC sitcom Only Fools and Horses. It was the fourth episode of series 7, and was first broadcast on 20 January 1991. In the episode, Del Boy, Rodney, Boycie, Denzil and Trigger attend a school reunion which, to their surprise, has been arranged by Roy Slater.

Synopsis
Del Boy and Rodney receive a fax on their new Futafax machine from Mike that a reunion for the 1962 class of the Martin Luther King Comprehensive School has been arranged at The Nag's Head. Raquel receives a letter from her solicitors explaining that they have managed to trace her estranged husband, who is considering her request for a divorce.

At the reunion, Del, Rodney, Boycie, Trigger, and Denzil all ponder who arranged it, as the organiser did not leave his name as he had paid with cash. After initially wondering if it was their sectioned headmaster, "Bend Over" Benson, the mystery organiser turns out to be reviled ex-police officer Roy Slater. A seemingly apologetic Slater explains that a five-year prison sentence for the diamond smuggling incident and the death of his father has prompted him to clean up his act, and he is now a born again Christian and has relocated to Colchester. After initial hostility, following numerous spurious charges Slater has placed on them in the past, Del and friends agree to forgive Slater and they head back to Nelson Mandela House for a few drinks and to reminisce about their schooldays. Denzil, Trigger, and Boycie all go home, but Slater falls asleep on the sofa. Raquel enters the flat and is frightened to see Slater who, it emerges, is her husband. Despite a heated argument between Slater and the group, the Trotters reluctantly let him stay for the night.

Later that night, Del, Rodney, and Albert discuss what would happen if anyone found out that Raquel was married to the despised Slater, which would result in Del's image being tarnished and many of his associates refusing to do business with him. Slater himself enters the room and reveals that he too is aware of the situation and implies that he will reveal it to everyone in Peckham if he is not adequately accommodated. Del gives Slater £40 and agrees to let him stay as long as he wants but as Rodney and Albert discover that Del actually gave Slater the money from Slater's own wallet, Rodney finds a post-nuptial agreement inside it, intended for Raquel to sign, in which she would waive her rights to his money. They also discover another document from a Bond Street diamond merchant, informing Slater about ten diamonds he deposited with them before he was sent to prison. Just as Del thinks he has the upper hand, Slater emerges from the bedrooms and takes back his wallet, which he has been looking for, and with it the evidence.

At the Nag's Head the following day, Raquel enters to find Slater conversing with Mike, she inquires as to why he is staying around when Del and Rodney enter. Raquel then goes to wait outside in the Trotter's van, as Del asks Slater if he had known all along that Raquel was living with him. Slater nonchalantly confesses, revealing to Del that he only organised the "reunion" idea to get into Del's flat and get Raquel to sign the post-nuptial agreement. Del and Rodney then show Slater one of their Futafax machines, which Del claims he used to make several photocopies of Slater's diamond documents. Slater retorts that he has already served his sentence for the diamond smuggling and cannot be tried for the same crime twice. Del continues that he and Rodney went to the local newspaper offices and read the reports of Slater's trial, which did not include the ten diamonds deposited with the dealer. If the incriminating documents were to be sent to the police, it would mean a new trial, and given Slater's criminal record most likely a return to prison with a longer sentence. Slater offers to split the money from the sale of the diamonds with the Trotters, but they decline, and instead offer Slater a deal: They will keep quiet over the diamonds and Slater can keep his money, but he is to give Raquel her divorce, leave Peckham for good, and never mention to anyone that he was married to her.

An aggravated Slater agrees to the deal and abruptly leaves. As he heads to the door however he asks Del to name his child after him. Rodney restrains Del and retorts that "christening a child 'Dick'" would be cruel. Slater vanishes, and Del explains to Rodney that when Slater sells his diamonds, Raquel can divorce him and legally be entitled to 50% of his money. Mike shows up and tells the Trotter brothers that the photocopier on the Futafax they sold him does not work. A laughing Del answers that his does not either, meaning that he and Rodney were lying to Slater all along.

Episode cast

Story arc 
This episode marks the final appearance of Roy Slater. He previously appeared in "May the Force Be With You" and "To Hull and Back". A teenage Slater would also appear in the 2010 comedy-drama prequel "Rock & Chips".
Raquel's ex-husband has been referred to numerous times, but this is the first episode in which he is identified as Slater.

Episode concept 
The idea for the script was based on a reunion that John Sullivan had with his football team.

Music
 The Cure: "Never Enough"
 Soul II Soul: "People"
 Manfred Mann: "Mighty Quinn"
 Lisa Stansfield: "All Around The World"
 Betty Boo: "Valentine's Day"

Note: "The Mighty Quinn" is cut out of the VHS/DVD versions.  It remains intact on iTunes.

References

External links

 
 

Only Fools and Horses (series 7) episodes
1991 British television episodes
Class reunions in popular culture